Mordacia lapicida, also known as the Chilean lamprey, is a species of southern topeyed lamprey endemic to southern Chile, where it can be found in riverine and marine habitats. This species is anadromous. This parasitic lamprey can reach a length of  SL. Ammocoetes and adults of this species are found in rivers, and occur in fine sand along river banks. The life cycle of a Mordacia lapicida is divided into three life stages: freshwater rearing, an ocean parasite and an adult spawning stage. Once in the adult stage, individuals migrate into marine waters where they attack and attach themselves to marine fishes.

References

lapicida
Fish of the Pacific Ocean
Fish of Chile
Endemic fauna of Chile
Taxonomy articles created by Polbot
Fish described in 1851
Taxa named by John Edward Gray